The following is a list of Hamilton Academical F.C. players who have played a first team league game for Hamilton Academical.

Current players

Former players

Notes

Sources
 
 
 Soccerbase
 Hamilton Academical Memory Bank

Players
 
Hamilton Academical
Association football player non-biographical articles
Players